KBFP-FM (105.3 MHz) is a commercial FM radio station licensed to Delano, California, and serving the Bakersfield metropolitan area.  The station is owned by iHeartMedia, Inc., and calls itself "Sunny 105.3."  It broadcasts an adult contemporary radio format, switching to Christmas music for much of November and December.   Most of the programming is syndicated:  "Valentine in the Morning" comes from co-owned KBIG Los Angeles, afternoon drive time is from "John Tesh Intelligence for Your Life" and evenings feature the call-in and dedication show "Delilah."  

KBFP-FM's radio studios are on Mohawk Street in southwest Bakersfield.  The transmitter is off Porterville Highway (California State Route 65) in Shafter, California.

History
105.3 FM signed on in 1981 with the call sign KZAY.  On December 11, 1987, KZAY changed to a country music format known as KAMM.  KAMM was on the air from December 1987 until March 1988 when KAMM became the new home for KKXX-FM (which had been at 107.9).  KKXX-FM was known as top 40 radio station "The New Power 105 KKXX FM", which was at 105.3 FM until July 2, 1998.  The call letters KKXX moved to 96.5 FM.  KKDJ, an oldies station that was at 98.5 FM at the time moved to 105.3 FM and was known as "Star 105.3". KKDJ changed formats in 2001 to adult contemporary and was known as "K-Lite 105.3".

On September 3, 2004, KKDJ changed formats to a Spanish-language adult contemporary format as La Preciosa 105.3. On January 1, 2006, the call letters KKDJ were changed to KBFP.   The KKDJ call letters are now owned by a television station in Arroyo Grande, California.

On August 31, 2018, the station flipped back to an English-language AC format as Sunny 105.3.

Previous logos

References

External links

Mainstream adult contemporary radio stations in the United States
Arroyo Grande, California
Radio stations in Bakersfield, California
Radio stations established in 1987
IHeartMedia radio stations
1987 establishments in California